The Data Management Association (DAMA), formerly known as the Data Administration Management Association, is a global not-for-profit organization which aims to advance concepts and practices about information management and data management. It describes itself as vendor-independent, all-volunteer organization,
and has a membership consisting of technical and business professionals. Its international branch is called DAMA International (or DAMA-I), and DAMA also has various continental and national branches around the world.

History 
The Data Management Association International was founded in 1980 in Los Angeles. Other early chapters were:San Francisco, Portland, Seattle, Minneapolis, NewYork, and Washington D.C.

Data Management Body of Knowledge  
DAMA has published the Data Management Body of Knowledge (DMBOK), which contains suggestions on best practices and suggestions of a common vernacular for enterprise data management. The first edition (DAMA-DMBOK) was published on 2015 April 5, and the second edition (DAMA-DMBOK2) was published on 2017 July 1.

DMBOK has been described by the authors as being an "equivalent" to the Project Management Body of Knowledge (PMBOK) and Business Analysis Body of Knowledge (BABOK). It encompasses topics such as data architecture, security, quality, modelling, governance, big data, data science, and more.

DAMA also provides a professional data management certification for individuals known as a Certified Data Management Professional (CDMP), which is based on the DMBOK as a study reference. It is an example of one of many competing certifications for data management professionals.

See also 
 Data management

References

External links 
 DAMA INTERNATIONAL

Data management
Bodies of knowledge
Standards organizations